Massilia haematophila is a Gram-negative, rod-shaped, non-spore-forming bacterium from the genus Massilia and  family  Oxalobacteraceae, which was isolated from a human clinical specimen.

References

External links
Type strain of Massilia haematophila at BacDive -  the Bacterial Diversity Metadatabase

Burkholderiales